"O.K. Funky God" is the ninth single released by Japanese singer Ami Suzuki under label Avex Trax. It was the first song released under the collaboration project "Join" of Suzuki, released along with Buffalo Daughter. It was released on 28 February 2007.

Information
"O.K. Funky God" was the first of the three collaboration weekly single to be released from the "Join" Project. The single was limited to ten thousand copies. As bonus material it also includes a narration drama track from "Join", which was later turned into a short movie included in the DVD of album Connetta.

Track listing

Charts
Oricon Sales Chart (Japan)

Ami Suzuki songs
2007 singles
2007 songs
Songs written by Ami Suzuki
Avex Trax singles